Eighteenth Street Lounge Music (ESL Music) is an independent record label based in Washington, D.C. founded by Rob Garza and Eric Hilton in 1996. The duo, as Thievery Corporation, heads the label's roster of artists.

Roster
ESL Music's current artists include:

Afrolicious
AM & Shawn Lee
Ancient Astronauts
Chris Joss
Congo Sanchez
Dust Galaxy
Federico Aubele
Frank Mitchell Jr.
Joe Bataan
Kabanjak
Natalia Clavier
Nickodemus
Novalima
Ocote Soul Sounds
The Archives
The Funk Ark
Thievery Corporation
Thunderball

See also
 List of record labels

References

External links
 Eighteenth Street Lounge
 

Record labels established in 1996
Music companies based in Washington, D.C.
American independent record labels
1996 establishments in Washington, D.C.
American companies established in 1996